Marcel Delattre (born 17 November 1939) is a former French cyclist. He competed in the team pursuit at the 1960 Summer Olympics.

References

External links
 

1939 births
Living people
French male cyclists
Olympic cyclists of France
Cyclists at the 1960 Summer Olympics
People from Puteaux
French track cyclists
Sportspeople from Hauts-de-Seine
Cyclists from Île-de-France